The United States national ball hockey team has been representing United States in the Ball Hockey World Championship since 1998. Is member of the International Street and Ball Hockey Federation (ISBHF).

World Championship

Current squad

References

External links 
http://www.usaballhockey.com

Ball hockey
Men's national sports teams of the United States